NGC 4221 is a barred lenticular galaxy located about 75.9 million light-years (23.28 megaparsecs) away in the constellation of Draco. It was discovered on April 3, 1832 by the astronomer John Herschel. NGC 4221 is notable for having an outer ring that surrounds the inner barred central region of the galaxy.

Group Membership 
NGC 4221 is a member of the NGC 4256 Group, which lies in the upper plane of the Virgo Supercluster.

See also
 List of NGC objects (4001–5000)
 NGC 2859 - similar looking galaxy

References

External links 
 

Draco (constellation)
4221
Barred lenticular galaxies
039266
7288
Ring galaxies
Virgo Supercluster